Albert Smith Barker (March 31, 1845 – January 30, 1916) was an admiral in the United States Navy who served during the American Civil War and the Spanish–American War.

Biography
Born in Hanson, Massachusetts, Barker graduated from the Naval Academy in 1862.

In July 1883, Albert Barker was commander of the screw-sloop USS Enterprise while on the East Coast of Africa at Zanzibar. He wrote a report on the "Trade of Zanzibar" of imports and exports for the years 1882–83. The trade of the port principally being with the United States, England, Germany, and France. Many vessels from these countries were employed in this trade process with America, such as the British man-of-war  stationed at Zanzibar as a store ship.

During the Spanish–American War he commanded the battleship USS Oregon and participated in the bombardment of Santiago on July 1, 1898. He was Commander-in-Chief of the North Atlantic Fleet from 1903 to 1905.

Rear Admiral Barker died January 30, 1916, in Washington, D.C.

Recognition
The destroyer  was named for him.

Gallery

Dates of rank
 United States Naval Academy Midshipman – Class of 1862

Barker never held the rank of LTJG (O-2) due to it not being created until later years. As well, Commodore is the modern day equivalent to Rear Admiral (lower half) and Rear Admiral then is equivalent to today's Rear Admiral (Upper Half).

Notes

References
 Marquis Who's Who, Inc. Who Was Who in American History, the Military. Chicago: Marquis Who's Who, 1975.  
 Reports from the Consul of the United States on the Commerce, Manufactures, Etc. of their consular districts. No. 31-July 1883. Published by the department of state, according to act of congress.

Attribution

1845 births
1916 deaths
United States Navy rear admirals (upper half)
People of Massachusetts in the American Civil War
American military personnel of the Spanish–American War
United States Naval Academy alumni
Burials at Arlington National Cemetery